Turku archipelago may refer to:
 Archipelago Sea, part of the Baltic Sea outside the Finnish city of Turku
 Islands of Turku, islands inside the city limits of Turku

See also
 Åboland (Finnish: Turunmaa), the Swedish-speaking part of the Archipelago Sea, excluding Åland, i.e. Pargas and Kimitoön